The 3rd Parliament of Antigua and Barbuda was elected on Tuesday, 29 November 1960 and was dissolved in 1965.

Members

Legislative Assembly 
Speaker: Hon. Cecil Hewlett

References 

Parliaments of Antigua and Barbuda